The Czechoslovak Traders' Party (ČŽOS) was a liberal and conservative political party in Czechoslovakia, whose notable leaders were Josef V. Najman and Rudolf Mlčoch.

History
The party was established in 1920 as a split from the National Democratic Party. In the first Czechoslovak elections later in the year the ČŽOS won six seats in the Chamber of Deputies and three in the Senate. The 1925 elections saw the party increase its parliamentary representation, winning 13 seats in the Chamber and six in the Senate.

In the 1929 elections the ČŽOS was reduced to 12 seats in the Chamber, but retained its six Senate seats. The party was more successful in the 1935 elections, winning 17 seats in the Chamber and eight in the Senate.

In 1938 the party merged into the Party of National Unity following the occupation of the country by Germany and Hungary.

Ideology
The party was established to represent independent retailers and craftsmen. It ran on a right-wing platform, and co-operated with the Republican Party of Farmers and Peasants in Parliament.

Electoral results

References

Political parties in Czechoslovakia
Political parties established in 1920
Political parties disestablished in 1938